Banana passionfruit (Passiflora supersect. Tacsonia), also known as taxo and curuba, is a group of around 64 Passiflora species found in South America. Most species in this section are found in high elevation cloud forest habitats. Flowers have a cylindrical hypanthium.

Species

Invasive species
P. tarminiana and P. tripartita thrive in the climate of New Zealand. They are invasive species since they can smother forest margins and forest regrowth. It is illegal to sell, cultivate and distribute the plants.

Seeds are spread by feral pigs, birds and humans. The vine can also be found all across the highlands of New Guinea and Tasmania.

References

External links
Purdue University (United States) - Banana passionfruit
 

Passiflora
Edible fruits
Crops originating from the Americas
Crops originating from Ecuador
Crops originating from Peru
Plant common names